Templecloud music is a bespoke music company owned by composer Simon Gwilliam.

"One Big Family"
"One Big Family" is the first single from Templecloud.  It is a cover of the 1997 Embrace single. It was released on iTunes on 24 May 2011. Many believed that it was sung by Paloma Faith. It was actually sung by Hannah Symons.

The fast food chain KFC aired an advert in the UK which used "One Big Family" as the soundtrack.

Discography

Singles

References

External links

Electronica music groups
English indie rock groups
Musical groups established in 2011
2011 establishments in England